Donar Munteanu (born Dimitrie Munteanu; June 26, 1886 – 1972) was a Romanian poet, representing the provincial wing of Romanian Symbolism, Convorbiri Critice circle and, later, the Gândirea literary movement. Generally considered a good, but not great, author, from his thirties and into old age he belonged to the devotional school of Orthodox Church writers, producing mostly sonnets. Professionally, he was active as a magistrate and prison inspector, a career which allowed him to visit the country and to participate in the literary life of Bessarabia. He withdrew from public life following the establishment of Romanian communist regime, and remained largely forgotten.

Biography
Born in Răcari, Dâmbovița County, Munteanu was of Transylvanian roots: his father, a schoolteacher, was a first-generation immigrant to the Kingdom of Romania. Making his publishing debut in Alexandru Macedonski's Forța Morală in 1901, and subsequently joining the Symbolist writing club at Literatorul, he enlisted at the University of Bucharest. He was a member of the Pahuci student fraternity, inviting Macedonski to its sessions, before graduating with a degree in law. Additionally, his work was hosted in Caion's Românul Literar. Macedonski held him in high esteem as "the incomparable maestro", but, according to literary historian George Călinescu, this should not dissuade from the fact that Munteanu was "minuscule" as a poet.

In 1904, he published the Symbolist magazine Pleiada, which ran for two editions, usually signing his pieces there as Donar. A regular at Mihail Dragomirescu's Convorbiri Critice magazine (from 1907), he was introduced by his new mentor an "idyllic poet from the Macedonski school". Dragomirescu also proposed that his piece Țiganii ("The Gipsies") should be considered "a descriptive, colorful, masterpiece". Published in May 1907, the poem was explained by Donar himself as a sample of "my wandering soul." Munteanu was also co-opted by Ion Minulescu at the radical Symbolist review, Revista Celor L'alți. His contribution there was noted by the anti-Symbolist traditionalist Nicolae Iorga, who believed Munteanu to be "a good versifier". The episode strained relations between Dragomirescu and Munteanu, since the former was being attacked by Minulescu. In April 1908, Munteanu wrote to apologize, and noted that, by then, he had already decided to end his collaboration with Revista Celor L'alți. In May, he joined the Convorbiri Critice editorial committee, which, by then, also comprised I. Dragoslav, Emil Gârleanu, A. de Herz, Eugen Lovinescu, Anastasie Mândru, Corneliu Moldovanu, and Cincinat Pavelescu.

After a "long and tiresome" administrative trip through Northern Dobruja, which he considered retelling as a novel, Munteanu began collecting his poetry into one "tiny volume", the 1909 Aripi negre ("Black Wings"). While he remained close to Dragomirescu, for whom he maintained "an unbound intellectual sympathy", Munteanu eventually moved on. From 1911 to 1916, he was a contributor to Flacăra. His activity was interrupted by World War I and the battles on the Romanian front. In 1916–1917, he was in Bârlad as a military prosecutor, visiting with Alexandru Vlahuță and joining the literary club known as Academia Bârlădeană, also frequented by George Tutoveanu, Victor Ion Popa, and Vasile Voiculescu. He had begun writing religious-themed poems such as Golgota, which Vlahuță reportedly asked him to recite at every Academia meeting, and more specifically his first sonnets. Munteanu had also served as a magistrate at Piatra Neamț, Iași, Bazargic, Câmpulung, Brăila, and, during the interwar, performed similar tasks in Sibiu, Odorhei, Deva and ultimately Chișinău. In July 1919, he was royal prosecutor at the trial of Hungarian academic István Apáthy, accused of "conspiracy against Romanian citizens" during the war over Transylvania.

During his stay in Bessarabia, he began contributing to the literary review Teatrul, put out by his Convorbiri Critice colleague, Pavelescu, and also had samples of his work featured in Transylvania's Gândirea (from 1930). In 1931, he married the Bessarabian Maria Niță, a teacher of Russian. In the few books that he published at significant intervals (Aripi fantastice, 1925; Simfonia vieții, 1943; Bisericuța neamului, 1943), Romantic echoes are found alongside Symbolist motifs, while, critic Rodica Zafiu notes, well-drawn images are eclipsed by an ample tendency toward grandiloquence. His sonnets, reviewer Ion Șiugariu notes, were conventional and prosaic, echoing both Sămănătorul and Parnassianism; although not "a great poet", Munteanu was "earnest", without the "obscurities" of modernist literature.

From 1937 to 1938, answering to Justice Minister Vasile P. Sassu, Munteanu worked as general director of penitentiaries. He was on hand to investigate the July 1937 prison riots at Târgu Ocna. Subsequently, he was a Permanent Councilor to the Legislative Council until June 1945, when he was ordered to retire. From the 1930s, Munteanu and Șerban Bascovici had been the two Symbolists turning to Christian-themed poetry, and were vacationing together at the "writers' home" in Bușteni. As noted by literary historian Dumitru Micu, Munteanu's poetry was by then "within the dogmatic canons of Orthodoxy", which represented the core vision of Gândirea. Such dogmatism, Micu argues, was only maintained by the group's "second-rate" poets: Munteanu, Sandu Tudor, and George Gregorian.

Munteanu survived the establishment of a Romanian communist regime, and, in 1956, was visiting fellow poet Dumitru Iov at his home in Bucharest. By 1965, he was living in Cotroceni, on Ștefan Furtună Alley. He died in Bucharest in 1972. Some two years later, fellow Symbolist Barbu Solacolu suggested a revisiting Munteanu's work, but later critics noted that Munteanu, "quite unfamiliar" or "downright forgotten" as a writer, "belongs to literary history".

Notes

References
George Călinescu, Istoria literaturii române de la origini pînă în prezent. Bucharest: Editura Minerva, 1986

1886 births
1972 deaths
20th-century Romanian poets
Romanian male poets
Symbolist poets
Christian poets
Sonneteers
Romanian magazine editors
Romanian magazine founders
Gândirea
Romanian civil servants
20th-century Romanian judges
Romanian prosecutors
Prison inspectors
People from Dâmbovița County
Members of the Romanian Orthodox Church
University of Bucharest alumni
Romanian Land Forces officers
Romanian military personnel of World War I
Romanian people of the Hungarian–Romanian War